Events from the year 1871 in art.

Events
 March – Edward Lear settles at his villa in Sanremo.
 Spring – James McNeill Whistler publishes Sixteen etchings of scenes on the Thames and paints his first "moonlights" (later called "nocturnes") of the river.
 March 18–May 28 – Paris Commune:
 April 5 – Federation of Artists, organized by Gustave Courbet, holds its first meeting in Paris. Membership includes Jules Dalou, Honoré Daumier, André Gill and Eugène Pottier; Jean-Baptiste-Camille Corot and Édouard Manet are also members but do not actively participate.
 May 16 – Napoleonic column in the Place Vendôme is pulled down according to a suggestion by Courbet, one of the events photographed by Bruno Braquehais.
 May – André-Adolphe-Eugène Disdéri photographs dead Communards.
 c. May – James Tissot flees Paris for London.
 June 14 – Camille Pissarro marries his mistress Julie Vellay in the London borough of Croydon and moves to Pontoise.
 August 14 – Courbet is sentenced to 6 months imprisonment and a fine for his participation in the Paris Commune; during his time in prison he produces a series of still life paintings of fruit and flowers.
 Summer – Claude Monet visits Zaandam.
 December – Monet and his wife Camille move to Argenteuil.
 William Morris and Dante Gabriel Rossetti become tenants of Kelmscott Manor, which they share with Jane Morris.
 Marie Spartali marries William James Stillman.
 Edwin B. Crocker establishes the Crocker Art Museum in Sacramento, California.

Works

 Frederic Edwin Church – The Parthenon
 Antonio Ciseri – Ecce Homo
Confederate Monument (Liberty, Mississippi)
 Edgar Degas – Count Lepic and His Daughters
Friedrich Drake – Statue of Alexander von Humboldt (Philadelphia)
 Thomas Eakins – Max Schmitt in a Single Scull
 Martin Johnson Heade – Cattleya Orchid and Three Hummingbirds
 Frank Holl – No Tidings from the Sea
 Daniel Huntington – The Narrows, Lake George
 Eastman Johnson – The Old Stagecoach
 Ivan Kramskoi – The Mermaids
 Édouard Manet
 The Harbour at Bordeaux (E.G. Bührle collection, Zürich)
 The Barricade (Civil War) (Museum of Fine Arts (Budapest))
 John Everett Millais – Victory O Lord!
 Claude Monet – A Windmill at Zaandam
 Albert Joseph Moore – Sea Gulls
 Camille Pissarro – Lordship Lane Station, Upper Norwood
 Vinnie Ream – Abraham Lincoln (marble, United States Capitol rotunda, Washington, D.C.)
 Randolph Rogers – Statue of Abraham Lincoln (bronze, Philadelphia)
 Dante Gabriel Rossetti
 Dante's Dream
 Pandora
 Amanda Sidwall – Self-portrait
 George Blackall Simonds – The Falconer sculpture
 Vasily Vereshchagin
 At the city wall: "Let them in!"
 The Apotheosis of War
 Heinrich von Angeli – Crown Princess Victoria of Prussia
 George Frederic Watts – Portrait of Frederic Leighton
 Alfred Waud – A Home on the Mississippi
 James McNeill Whistler
 Arrangement in Grey and Black No.1 ("Whistler's Mother")
 Nocturne: Blue and Silver – Chelsea
 Symphony in Grey: Early Morning, Thames
 Variations in Pink And Grey – Chelsea
 Variations in Violet and Green – Chelsea

Births
 January 27 – Samuel Peploe, Scottish painter (died 1935)
 March 2 – Albert Herter, American painter (died 1950)
 March 9 – Granville Redmond, American painter (died 1935)
 April 11 – Theodor Pallady, Romanian painter (died 1956)
 May ? – Elinor Darwin, née Monsell, Irish-born engraver and portrait painter (died 1954)
 May 1 – Miklós Ligeti, Hungarian sculptor (died 1944)
 May 11 – Mariano Fortuny, Spanish-born fashion designer (died 1949)
 May 27 – Georges Rouault, French Expressionist painter and stained glass artist (died 1958)
 June 12 – Victor David Brenner, Lithuanian-born American medalist, sculptor and engraver (died 1924)
 July 24 – Giacomo Balla, Italian painter (died 1958)
 August 22 – Émile André, French architect and designer (died 1933)
 October 26 – Guillermo Kahlo, German-born photographer (died 1941)
 date unknown – Peter Moog, German outsider artist (died 1930)

Deaths
 January 1 – Alexander Munro, Scottish-born Pre-Raphaelite sculptor (born 1825)
 January 14 – Eduardo Zamacois y Zabala, Spanish painter (born 1841)
 January 18 – Sir George Hayter, English painter, specialising in portraits (born 1792)
 January 19 – Henri Regnault, French painter (born 1843)
 February 8 – Moritz von Schwind, Austrian painter (born 1804)
 February 20 – Paul Kane, Irish-Canadian painter (born 1810)
 February 26 – Sophia Hawthorne, American painter and illustrator (born 1809)
 March 3 – Michael Thonet, German-Austrian furniture designer (born 1796)
 March – Emma Fürstenhoff, Swedish florist (born 1802)
 April 6 – Emma Eleonora Kendrick, English miniature painter (born 1788)
 April 24 – Karl Girardet, French painter (born 1813)
 June 9 – Anna Atkins, English botanist and pioneer photographer (born 1799)
 June 19 – Johann Fischbach, Austrian painter of landscapes and genre arts (born 1797)
 July 30 – Edwin Wilkins Field, English lawyer and painter (born 1804)
 October 14 – Johan Frederik Møller, Danish painter and photographer (born 1797)
 December 9 – Josef Mánes, Czech painter (born 1820)
 December 21 – Paul Guigou, French painter (born 1834)

References

 
Years of the 19th century in art
1870s in art